The 2013 Challenge Cup (also known as the Tetley's Challenge Cup for sponsorship reasons) was the 112th staging of the most competitive European rugby league tournament at club level and was open to teams from England, Wales, Scotland and France. It began its preliminary stages in October 2012.

Warrington were the reigning champions, but lost 12–16 to Hull F.C. in the semifinal, who would go on to lose the final 0–16 to Wigan.

First qualifying round
The draw for the first qualifying round was made on Wednesday 10 October 2012 at Carrwood Park in Leeds, and took place on the weekend of 27/28 October 2012. A total of 40 teams played in the qualifying rounds. The clubs involved included 22 NCL Divisions 1 and 2, 5 regional league winners, the Yorkshire and Lancashire County Cup winners, 1 Cumberland ARL nomination and the British Police. Also in the draw were the Scottish champions and a Welsh representative, 4 teams from the 2011 Rugby League Conference National, 6 Student teams and a North West League representative. The teams were drawn out by Damian Clayton MBE, the representative for the Armed Forces on the Community Board, and Martin Coyd, the Tier 4 representative. A total of 57 community teams were involved in the 2013 competition which culminated at Wembley in August; the three Armed Services teams and 14 Conference League Premier teams entered the competition at a later stage.

Notes

A. Game switched to Recreation Ground (Whitehaven).
B. Withdrew from Challenge Cup due to player shortages.

Second qualifying round

The Draw for the second qualifying round was made on Wednesday 10 October at Carrwood Park in Leeds, and the ties took place on 3/4 November 2012. The 20 winners from the first qualifying round were involved with the three Armed Services teams and 14 Conference League Premier teams entering the competition at a later stage.

Notes

C. Withdrew from Challenge Cup.

First round

The draw for the first round of the 2013 Challenge Cup was held at the RFL's Red Hall headquarters in Leeds on 29 October. The home teams were drawn by Paul Kilbride, a former professional rugby league footballer who has been supported by the RL Benevolent Fund since suffering a serious injury while playing, and the away teams were drawn by Rugby League Cares General Manager Chris Rostron.

The first round took place on the weekend of 1 and 2 December 2012, although the match between Bradford Dudley Hill and Leeds Met was played on 10 November. The match between Millom RLFC and Blackbrook Royals eventually had to be cancelled as the tie had been postponed four times and the away team, Blackbrook received a bye to Round 2.

Notes:
† – After extra time

Second round
The draw for the second round of the 2013 Challenge Cup was held at Millom Rugby League Club on 18 January. The draw involved 14 Conference League Premier clubs, the three Armed Services teams and the five clubs that had progressed from the first round. The balls were drawn by Millom club stalwart Gary Kelly and Workington Town player Peter Lupton, who played for Millom as a junior before signing professional terms at London Broncos. The second round took place on the weekend of 9/10 March 2013.

Notes:
† – After extra time

Third round
The draw for the third round was hosted in the Rugby Pavilion at the home of Oxford RL, the historic Iffley Road sports ground in Oxford on 13 March 2013 at 13:00 GMT. The draw was made by the actor Kevin Whately, who starred in the TV series Inspector Morse and its spin-off Lewis, and Bruce Ray, the communications director of Carlsberg UK, who own the Tetley's brand that sponsors the 2013 tournament.

The third round of the Challenge Cup had the entry of the 23 Kingstone Press Championship and Championship One clubs, which for the first time in the competition, included Oxford, Hemel Stags and the Gloucestershire All Golds.

The third round matches took place on the weekend of 6 and 7 April 2013.

Notes:
D. Match moved to Wilderspool in Warrington
E. Match moved to St. Helens's Langtree Park
F. Match move to Hull RUFC
G. Match move to Laund Hill

Fourth round

The draw for the fourth round of the 2013 Challenge Cup took place on 8 April 2013 at 15:30 BST at the Halliwell Jones Stadium in Warrington. The draw saw the 14 Super League teams joined by the 18 winning teams from the third round. The draw was made by Rugby League Hall of Fame member Alex Murphy and Bruce Ray, who is Communications Director of Carlsberg UK, the parent company of title sponsors Tetley's and was broadcast on BBC Radio 5 Live. Matches took place on 19, 20 and 21 April 2013 with the Hull Kingston Rovers vs St. Helens match being shown live on BBC One.

Notes:
H. Match moved to Wakefield Trinity's Belle Vue Stadium.

Fifth round
The draw for the fifth round of the 2013 Challenge Cup took place on Monday 22 April 2013 at 15:30 BST on BBC Radio 5 Live with ex-Wigan player Billy Boston making the draw. Matches were played on 10, 11 and 12 May 2013 with the Huddersfield-Leeds match shown live on BBC One on 11 May.

Quarter-finals
The draw for the quarter-finals took place on 18 May with the draw shown on BBC Breakfast on BBC One by presenters Louise Minchin and Charlie Stayt. Matches took place over four days between 12 and 15 July 2013 with matches on Saturday 13 and Sunday 14 July shown live on BBC Two and the matches on Friday 12 and Monday 15 July shown live by Sky Sports.

Semi-finals
The draw for the semifinals of the 2013 Challenge Cup took place on 14 July on BBC Two after the televised Warrington-Huddersfield match on the same channel and was made by Des Drummond and Henderson Gill. The matches took place on 27 and 28 July 2013 at neutral venues.

Final

The final of the 2013 Challenge Cup took place on 24 August 2013 at Wembley Stadium with the match kicking off at 15:00 BST. The match was shown live on BBC One with Wigan winning 16–0.

Teams:

Hull: Jamie Shaul, Jason Crookes, Ben Crooks, Kirk Yeaman, Tom Briscoe, Daniel Holdsworth, Jacob Miller, Mark O'Meley, Danny Houghton, Liam Watts, Gareth Ellis, (captain) Danny Tickle, Joe Westerman. Coach: Peter Gentle

Replacements: Richard Whiting, Andy Lynch, Aaron Heremaia, Jay Pitts.

Wigan Warriors: Sam Tomkins, Josh Charnley, Darrell Goulding, Iain Thornley, Pat Richards, Blake Green, Matty Smith, Ben Flower, Michael McIlorum, Lee Mossop, Harrison Hansen, Liam Farrell, Sean O'Loughlin (captain). Coach: Shaun Wane

Replacements: Gil Dudson, Scott Taylor, Chris Tuson, Logan Tomkins.
Tries: Thornley (1), S Tomkins (1) Goals: Richards (4).

UK Broadcasting rights
The tournament was jointly televised by the BBC and Sky Sports on the second of their five-year contracts.

 Except Scotland

Sky Sports televised the other two quarter final matches live. The first on Friday July 12 between Sheffield Eagles and London Broncos and the second on Monday July 15 between Warrington Wolves and Huddersfield Giants.

References

External links
 Challenge Cup official website

Challenge Cup
Challenge Cup
Challenge Cup
2013 in French rugby league
2013 in Welsh rugby league
2013 in Scottish sport